Satokata Takahashi, born  was also known as Satokata Takahishi, Satokata Takahashiin, Taka Ashe, and his first name was sometimes rendered as Satakata.  Takahashi was an alleged major of the Imperial Japanese Army and member of the Black Dragon Society. According to FBI reports he was the instigator of the Pacific Movement of the Eastern World, working through Ashima Takis.

Background 
When Mimo De Guzman was arrested by the FBI on July 30, 1942, he revealed that Takahashi was "a Japanese National" that was "the real power behind such groups as the Pacific Movement of the Eastern World, the Onward Movement of America and the Ethiopian Pacific Movement.

Personal life 
Elijah Muhammad was friends with Takahashi, and Takahashi's wife, Pearl Sherrod was formerly a member of the Nation of Islam.

Influence 
In the 1940s Selective Service registrars noticed African Americans in Chicago, Detroit, and several other large cities were refusing to register under religious grounds and described themselves as Muslim. They also were not seeking an exemption as conscientious objectors. Around this same time the FBI was receiving reports that Japan was funding African American groups that were radical and wanted a racial revolution. In April 1942, the FBI used undercover officers to infiltrate a group.

Black Dragon society
Through Takahashi, the Black Dragon society channeled financial aid to Black Muslim groups in the US.

Society for the Development of Our Own
Takahashi's Society for the Development of Our Own was a major organization in Black America responsible for the dissemination of pro-Japanese propaganda. He recruited several thousand members to the Pan-Asian cause, most of them of African-American, Filipino, or East Asian descent. The "Five Guiding Principles" of the group were "Freedom, Justice, Equality, Liberty, and Honour."

Nation of Islam
In 1939 the FBI charged that Nakane had been an influential presence in the Nation of Islam. He spoke as a guest at the NOI temples in Detroit and Chicago. He also influenced Elijah Muhammad's attitude towards the Japanese government. The FBI had a copy of a speech from 1933 where Mohammad proclaimed that the Japanese would kill the white man.

FBI informants noted that NOI's flag of a white crescent and white moon with a red background was similar to Japan's flag of a red sun with white rays on a red background. They also noted that the flag was similar to Turkey, whose population is mostly Muslim, and that the flag was similar to Soviet Union's whose flag is red with a single star and sickle.

Nakane was deported and moved to Canada. When he tried to return he was charged with attempting to bribe an immigration officer and illegal entry.

In an interview with the FBI Elijah  Mohammad claimed he met Takahashi at a woman’s house, but could not recall who the woman was. He went there to pick up Brother Abdul Mohammad. Mohammad also claimed that Takahishi stayed at Abdul's house for several weeks because he was recovering from an illness. Additionally, Mohammad claimed that he and Takahishi discussed NOI and that Takahishi approved of his teachings.

The poster was of a map of the United States with Fard in the center, and was entitled "Calling the Four Winds." From each of the four directions there were guns that said "Asia" aimed at the US. Takahashi’s poster was almost identical, except Takahashi was in the center.  "Calling the Four Winds" is a speech written by Cheaber McIntyre, Takahishi's mistress.

See also
1943 Detroit race riot

References

External links
 
 African-American Religion - A Historical Interpretation with Representative Documents
 
HEAVENESE:Glory:Story
HEAVENESE:Glory:Story5
安楽椅子探検家のヴァーチャル書斎 - (43)アメリカ黒人に決起を促した中根中

Imperial Japanese Army officers
COINTELPRO targets
Japanese spies
1870 births
1945 deaths